Bacchisa guerryi is a species of beetle in the family Cerambycidae. It was described by Pic in 1911. It is known from Laos and China. It contains the varietas Bacchisa guerryi var. apicalis.

References

G
Beetles described in 1911